Jyotindra Nath Dixit (8 January 1936 – 3 January 2005) was an Indian diplomat, who as served as Foreign Secretary (1991–1994), the top bureaucrat in the Ministry of External Affairs. At the time of his death, he was the National Security Adviser (India) to the Prime Minister Manmohan Singh and is most remembered for his role as a negotiator in disputes with Pakistan and China.

Early life and education
Born in Chennai, then known as Madras, to famous Malayali writer Munshi Paramu Pillai and Retnamayi Devi. He got his surname, Dixit, from his stepfather Sitaram Dixit, a freedom fighter and journalist.

He did his schooling in Central India, Rajasthan and Delhi. thereafter he did BA Honours Degree in Philosophy, Economics and Political Science the Zakir Husain College (University of Delhi) (1952 Batch), then he did his Master's in international law and international relations from Delhi University, and pursued studies for Doctoral Degree at the Indian School of International Studies, now part of Jawaharlal Nehru University.

Career

He joined the Indian Foreign Service in 1958, and served in Vienna, Austria, became India's Deputy High Commissioner to Bangladesh (1971–74) after its liberation. Subsequently, he served as Deputy Chief of Mission at the Embassies in Tokyo and Washington, followed by Ambassador in Chile, Mexico (1960-1961 3rd Secretary), Japan, Australia, Afghanistan (1980–85); High Commissioner Sri Lanka (1985–89) and Pakistan (1989–91). He was Chief administrator of Indian aid in Bhutan.

He later served as the Indian Foreign Secretary from 1991 and ultimately retired from Government service in 1994. He was also a representative of India to the UN, UNIDO, UNESCO, ILO and Non-Aligned Movement (NAM). He was a member of the first National Security Advisory Board. He was also the author of several books. He was the High Commissioner in Colombo in 1987 when India signed an accord with Sri Lanka government and deployed of the Indian Peace Keeping Force (IPKF) to the Tamil area in the island nation at the height of ethnic crisis.

He succeeded to the post of the National Security Advisor in 2004. And his columns on international and regional affairs, appeared regularly in various publications including Outlook and Indian Express and remained a visiting lecturer at many educational institutions.

Personal life and death
J N Dixit, died on 3 January 2005, in New Delhi, after suffering a heart attack. He was married to Vijaya Lakshmi Dixit (née Sundaram) and had five children, Ashok Dixit married to Mandakini Dixit (née Haldipurkar), Rahul Dixit married to Rupa Dixit(née Thakkar), Aabha Dixit married V. B (Anand) Dhavle, Dipa Dixit married to Rajiv Shakdher and the late Dhruv Dixit, who died in 2002. His grandchildren are Sanghamitra Dixit, Sumiran and Sagiri Dixit, Jaidev and Abhishek Dhavle and Vasudhaa Shakdher. He married a second time. He was the first National Security Advisor who died in office.

Awards and honours
India's second highest civilian award, the Padma Vibhushan, was posthumously conferred on J N Dixit in 2005.

Works
 Self in Autumn, 1982 (collection of poems)
 Anatomy of a Flawed Inheritance: A Survey of Indo–Pak Relations 1970–94, Konark Publishers, 1995
 My South Block Years, UBS publi
 Assignment Colombo, Konark Publishers, 1997.
 Across Borders: Fifty Years of India's Foreign Policy, PICUS Publishers. 1998.
 Liberation and Beyond: Indo-Bangladesh Relations 1971–99, Konark Publishers. 1999.
 An Afghom: Diary-Zahir Shah to Taliban, Konark Publishers, 2000.
 Indian Foreign Policies and its Neighbours, Gyan Books, New Delhi, 2001. .
 India’s Foreign Policy—challenge Of Terrorism Fashioning Interstate Equations, by Gyan Books, 2003. 
 External Affairs. Roli Books, 2003. .
 Indian Foreign Service: History And Challenge. Konark Publishers, 2005. .

See also
 National Security Council
 Navtej Sarna
 Taranjit Singh Sandhu
 Harsh Vardhan Shringla

References

External links

 J.N. Dixit, Official biography Indian Embassy
 J. N. Dixit Columns at Outlook
 A Mission in Jaffna & the Memories of War-Torn Jaffna

1936 births
2005 deaths
Delhi University alumni
Jawaharlal Nehru University alumni
High Commissioners of India to Pakistan
Permanent Representatives of India to the United Nations
Permanent Delegates of India to UNESCO
Indian Foreign Secretaries
Indian male writers
Foreign policy writers
Indian international relations scholars
Indian columnists
Malayali people
Recipients of the Padma Vibhushan in civil service
High Commissioners of India to Bangladesh
Ambassadors of India to Chile
Ambassadors of India to Japan
Ambassadors of India to Afghanistan
High Commissioners of India to Australia
High Commissioners of India to Sri Lanka
Indian Foreign Service officers
Indian political writers
20th-century Indian non-fiction writers
Politicians from Chennai
Writers from Chennai
Indian foreign policy writers
Scholars of Indian foreign policy
International relations historians
Indian Peace Keeping Force
People of the Sri Lankan Civil War